Lahai, also spelt Laha is a remote settlement located in the north eastern part of Pathanamthitta district, Kerala state, India.
This is the place from which the sacred grove (Poongavanam) of Lord Ayyappa begins.

Geography
The place is covered by thick forests of Ranni division.

Demographics
The average population is about 3000 people.

Climate 

Lahai experiences a tropical climate as in many parts of Kerala. Significant amount of rainfall occurs during the months of June, July and August. Humidity is comparatively less here with an average annual temperature of about 29.37°C. The average annual precipitation is 2407mm. The months of January and February receives low rainfall. Temperature falls in December and January to 20°C. March, April and May are the hottest months in the year.

Location
Lahai is blessed with naturally beautiful landscapes and with tropical rain forests of Ranni forest division. The Sabarimala forest (Poongavanam) begins from Lahai. Most important fact is that the uphill road to Sabarimala ends at Lahai and become level road all the way to Sabarimala.

The famous Sabarigiri Hydro electric Project in 1960s had built heavy equipment transportation road to Moozhiyar Power House. This road now exclusively used by pilgrims to Sabarimala.

Lahai is a historical place in many regards. The Sabarimala Thiruvabharanam procession comes to Lahai forest Bungalow, stays overnight and continues to Sabarimala temple.

Nearby places 
 Perunad
 Puthukkada
 Velamplavu
 Manakkayam
 Plappally
 Elavumkal
 Chittar
 Vadasserikkara

References

External links
 

Villages in Pathanamthitta district